Carlos Armando Gruezo Quiñónez (born 1975-09-18 in Quinindé) is a retired football forward from Ecuador, who earned one cap for the Ecuador national team during his career. His only appearance came on 14 October 1998 when Ecuador lost 5–1 in a friendly against Brazil, and Gruezo was a second-half substitute for Ariel Graziani. He is the father of Carlos Armando Gruezo Arboleda.

Honors

Club
 Deportivo Cuenca
 Serie A de Ecuador: 2004

References

External links
 Carlos Armando Gruezo Quiñónez at 11v11.com

1975 births
Living people
People from Quinindé Canton
Association football forwards
Ecuadorian footballers
Ecuador international footballers
Barcelona S.C. footballers
S.D. Aucas footballers
C.D. ESPOLI footballers
C.D. El Nacional footballers
C.D. Cuenca footballers
L.D.U. Portoviejo footballers
S.D. Quito footballers